Mary-Louise Parker (born August 2, 1964) is an American actress. After making her Broadway debut as Rita in Craig Lucas' Prelude to a Kiss in 1990 (for which she received a Tony Award nomination), Parker came to prominence for film roles in Grand Canyon (1991), Fried Green Tomatoes (1991), The Client (1994), Bullets over Broadway (1994), A Place for Annie (1994), Boys on the Side (1995), The Portrait of a Lady (1996), and The Maker (1997). Among stage and independent film appearances thereafter, Parker received the 2001 Tony Award for Best Actress in a Play for her portrayal of Catherine Llewellyn in David Auburn's Proof, among other accolades. Between 2001 and 2006, she recurred as Amy Gardner in the NBC television series The West Wing, for which she was nominated for the Primetime Emmy Award for Outstanding Supporting Actress in a Drama Series in 2002. She received both a Golden Globe and a Primetime Emmy Award for her portrayal of Harper Pitt in the acclaimed HBO television miniseries Angels in America in 2003.

Parker went on to enjoy large success as Nancy Botwin, the lead character in the television series Weeds, which ran from 2005 to 2012 and for which she received three nominations for the Primetime Emmy Award for Outstanding Lead Actress in a Comedy Series between 2007 and 2009 and received the Golden Globe Award for Best Actress – Television Series Musical or Comedy in 2006.

Her later film appearances include roles in The Spiderwick Chronicles (2008), Red (2010), R.I.P.D. (2013), and Red 2 (2013). Parker returned to Broadway in 2019 to star in The Sound Inside, for which she won her second Tony Award for Best Actress in a Play. In 2022, she reprised the role of Li'l Bit, which she had originated off-Broadway in 1997, in How I Learned to Drive on Broadway, a performance which earned Parker her fifth Tony nomination. Since 2007, Parker has contributed articles to Esquire magazine and published her memoir, Dear Mr. You, in 2015. In 2017, she starred as Roma Guy on the ABC television miniseries When We Rise.

Early life
Parker was born in Columbia, South Carolina, the youngest of four children, to Caroline Louise (née Morell) and John Morgan Parker, a judge who served in the U.S. Army. Her ancestry includes Swedish (from her maternal grandfather), English, Scottish, Irish, German, and Dutch. Because of her father's career, Parker spent parts of her childhood in South Carolina, Tennessee and Texas, as well as in Thailand, Germany, and France. She described her childhood as "profoundly unhappy", noting that, "My parents did everything they could; I had books, clothes, a home and a warm bed, but I was never happy." She graduated from Marcos de Niza High School in Tempe, Arizona. Parker majored in drama at the University of North Carolina School of the Arts and graduated in 1986.

Acting career

1980s
Parker got her start in acting with a role on the soap opera Ryan's Hope. In the late 1980s, Parker moved to New York. After a few minor roles, she made her Broadway debut in a production of Craig Lucas' Prelude to a Kiss, playing the lead role of Rita, in 1990. She moved with the production when it transferred from its origin off-Broadway. Parker won the Clarence Derwent Award for her performance and was nominated for a Tony Award (although she did not play the role when the film was made). In 1989 she was in the film Longtime Companion, a film starring Campbell Scott, Bruce Davison and Dermot Mulroney about the emergence and devastation of the AIDS epidemic.

1990s
Parker starred with Kevin Kline in Grand Canyon (1991); with Kathy Bates, Mary Stuart Masterson, and Jessica Tandy in Fried Green Tomatoes (1991); with Susan Sarandon and Tommy Lee Jones in The Client (1994); with John Cusack in Bullets over Broadway (1994); and with Drew Barrymore and Whoopi Goldberg in Boys on the Side (1995), as a woman with AIDS. Parker's next role was in a movie adaptation of another Craig Lucas play, Reckless (1995), alongside Mia Farrow, followed by Jane Campion's The Portrait of a Lady (1996), which also starred Nicole Kidman, Viggo Mortensen, Christian Bale, John Malkovich and Barbara Hershey. In addition, she appeared alongside Matthew Modine in Tim Hunter's The Maker (1997).

Parker's theater career continued when she appeared off-Broadway in Paula Vogel's 1997 critical smash How I Learned to Drive, with David Morse. She received the 1997 Lucille Lortel Award, Outstanding Actress, and 1997 Obie Award, Performance for her performance.

In the late 1990s, she appeared in several independent films, including Let the Devil Wear Black and The Five Senses. She starred alongside Sidney Poitier in the 1999 movie The Simple Life of Noah Dearborn.

2000–2003
From 2000 to 2001, Parker starred in the play Proof in off-Broadway and Broadway productions, winning the Tony Award for Best Actress in a Play for the latter.

On December 7, 2003, HBO aired a six-and-a-half-hour adaptation of Tony Kushner's acclaimed Broadway play Angels in America, directed by Mike Nichols. Parker played Harper Pitt, the Mormon, Valium-addicted wife of a closeted lawyer. For her performance, Parker received the Golden Globe Award and Primetime Emmy Award, both for Best Supporting Actress in a Miniseries or Television Film.

2004–2006
In 2004, Parker appeared in the comedy Saved! and a television film called Miracle Run, based on the true story of a mother of two sons with autism, as well as appearing in the lead role in Craig Lucas' Reckless on Broadway. The production, directed by Mark Brokaw, earned Parker another nomination for a Tony Award for Best Actress in 2005.

In November 2005, Parker was the subject of a career exhibition at Boston University, where memorabilia from her career were donated to the university's library. In 2006, Parker received the Golden Globe Award for Best Actress – Television Series Musical or Comedy, given by the Hollywood Foreign Press Association, for her lead role in Weeds. In that category, she defeated the four leads of Desperate Housewives. She dedicated the award to the late John Spencer, known for his work as Leo McGarry on The West Wing. After receiving the award, Parker stated: "I'm really in favor of legalizing marijuana. I don't think it's that controversial."

2007–present
In March 2007, Parker played the lead role in the television film The Robber Bride. She then portrayed Zerelda Mimms in the Andrew Dominik film The Assassination of Jesse James by the Coward Robert Ford, which opened in cinemas in September 2007. Parker appeared alongside Brad Pitt, Casey Affleck, Sam Rockwell, and Garret Dillahunt. In August 2007, Parker continued her role in the third season of Weeds.

Parker appeared in 2008's The Spiderwick Chronicles and in off-Broadway's Playwrights Horizons production in the New York premiere of Dead Man's Cell Phone, a new play by Sarah Ruhl, alongside Drama Desk Award winner Kathleen Chalfant.

She filmed the Donna Vermeer film Les Passages alongside Julie Delpy. Following this, she returned to work on the fifth season of Weeds. Parker took the lead role in the Roundabout Theatre Broadway revival of the play Hedda Gabler, running from January through March 29, 2009. The play garnered a series of negative reviews.

Parker starred opposite Bruce Willis in the film Red, an adaptation of the comic book miniseries of the same name. The film was released on October 15, 2010. In 2011, Parker became the host for the tenth season of the PBS documentary series Independent Lens. In 2013 she played roles in both Red 2 and R.I.P.D. She appeared in the Broadway Manhattan Theatre Club production of the play The Snow Geese by Sharr White at the Samuel J. Friedman Theatre from October 24 through December 15, 2013. The play was directed by Daniel J. Sullivan and also starred Danny Burstein and Victoria Clark.

Parker starred in the play by Simon Stephens, Heisenberg, produced off-Broadway by the Manhattan Theatre Club. The play, directed by Mark Brokaw, opened on June 2, 2015. The play extended its run, closing on July 11, 2015. The play transferred to Broadway at the Samuel J. Friedman Theatre, with previews starting on September 20, 2016, officially opening on October 13, with Parker and Denis Arndt reprising their roles.

She starred on Broadway in the Adam Rapp play The Sound Inside at Studio 54 starting on September 14, 2019, in previews, officially on October 17. She performed in the world premiere of the play in June to July 2018 at the Williamstown Theatre Festival. In September 2021, she won the Tony Award for Best Actress in a Play for the Broadway run.

She appeared in the Broadway revival by the Manhattan Theatre Club of How I Learned to Drive, which was supposed to open at the Samuel J. Friedman Theatre on March 27, 2020, in previews. David Morse co-starred, with direction by Mark Brokaw. This production united Parker, Morse and Brokaw from the original 1997 production. Because of the COVID-19 pandemic, this production was postponed to Manhattan Theater Club's 2021–22 season.

Writing career
Since 2007, Parker has contributed articles to Esquire magazine. In November 2015, Scribner Books, an imprint of Simon & Schuster, published her memoir in letters titled Dear Mr. You.

Personal life
From 1996 to November 2003, Parker dated actor Billy Crudup. Their relationship ended in 2003 when Parker was seven months pregnant with their son, William Atticus Parker, when Crudup left Parker for actress Claire Danes. William's godmother is actress Susan Sarandon.

In December 2006, Parker began dating actor Jeffrey Dean Morgan, whom she had met on the set of Weeds. On February 12, 2008, Parker and Morgan announced their engagement, only to break up the following April.

In September 2007, Parker adopted a baby girl, Caroline Aberash Parker, from Ethiopia.

In 2013, Parker was honored for her work with Hope North, an organization that works in the educating and healing of young victims in Uganda's civil war. The actress began her involvement with the organization after meeting a former victim of Uganda's civil war.

Parker lives in Brooklyn Heights.

Parker practices transcendental meditation. She says: "I'd always heard about transcendental meditation, and I thought, maybe that's the way back in for me. I learned TM and it changed everything." She also participates in a charity dinner for veteran victims of post-traumatic stress disorder organized by the David Lynch Foundation with Tom Hanks.

Filmography

Film

Television

Theatre credits

Awards and nominations

References

External links

 
 
 
 

1964 births
20th-century American actresses
21st-century American actresses
Actresses from Columbia, South Carolina
American expatriates in France
American expatriates in Germany
American expatriates in Thailand
American film actresses
American people of Dutch descent
American people of English descent
American people of German descent
American people of Irish descent
American people of Scottish descent
American people of Swedish descent
American soap opera actresses
American stage actresses
American television actresses
Audiobook narrators
Best Musical or Comedy Actress Golden Globe (television) winners
Best Supporting Actress Golden Globe (television) winners
Drama Desk Award winners
Esquire (magazine) people
HIV/AIDS activists
Living people
Outstanding Performance by a Supporting Actress in a Miniseries or Movie Primetime Emmy Award winners
Tony Award winners
University of North Carolina School of the Arts alumni
Writers from Columbia, South Carolina
People from Brooklyn Heights
American musical theatre actresses